Grigg Peak is a peak  high, located  west of the northern tip of the Lyttelton Range in the Admiralty Mountains of Victoria Land, Antarctica. This topographical feature was first mapped by the United States Geological Survey from surveys and U.S. Navy air photos, 1960–63, and was so named by the Advisory Committee on Antarctic Names for Gordon C. Grigg, a United States Antarctic Research Program biologist at McMurdo Station, Hut Point Peninsula, Ross Island, 1966–67. The peak lies situated on the Pennell Coast, a portion of Antarctica lying between Cape Williams and Cape Adare.

References

Mountains of Victoria Land
Pennell Coast